Heike Fischer (born 7 September 1982 in Demmin) is a German diver. She and Ditte Kotzian won bronze for Diving at the 2008 Summer Olympics – Women's synchronized 3 metre springboard. She and Kotzian had previously won a silver medal for diving at the 2007 World Aquatics Championships.

Fischer competed in the Diving at the 2004 Summer Olympics – Women's 3 metre springboard.

She lives in Leipzig, and is a sports soldier in the Bundeswehr. She is studying business studies at the AKAD-Fachhochschule Leipzig.

Her trainer is Margit Fischer.

References 

1982 births
Living people
People from Demmin
German female divers
Olympic divers of Germany
Olympic bronze medalists for Germany
Divers at the 2004 Summer Olympics
Divers at the 2008 Summer Olympics
Olympic medalists in diving
Medalists at the 2008 Summer Olympics
Sportspeople from Mecklenburg-Western Pomerania
21st-century German women